Runar Granholm (25 July 1889 – 3 November 1937) was a Finnish tennis player. He competed in the men's singles and doubles events at the 1924 Summer Olympics.

References

External links
 

1889 births
1937 deaths
Finnish male tennis players
Olympic tennis players of Finland
Tennis players at the 1924 Summer Olympics
Sportspeople from Helsinki